Norbert Max Samuelson (February 15, 1936- May 9, 2022) was a scholar of Jewish philosophy. He was Professor Emeritus at Arizona State University, having held the Grossman Chair of Jewish Studies there. He wrote 13 books and over 200 articles, with research interests in Jewish philosophy, philosophy and religion, philosophy and science, 20th-century philosophy (with an emphasis on Alfred North Whitehead and Franz Rosenzweig), history of Western philosophy, and Jewish Aristotelians (with an emphasis on Gersonides). He also lectured at university-level conferences around the world.

Academic biography

Education
Samuelson earned his bachelor's degree at Northwestern University in 1957. He then attended the Hebrew Union College-Jewish Institute of Religion, where he earned his Bachelor of Hebrew Letters in 1959 and his Master of Hebrew Letters and rabbinic ordination in 1962. He received his doctorate at Indiana University in 1970, writing his dissertation on "The Problem of God's Knowledge in Gersonides – A Translation of and Commentary to Book III of the Milhamot Adonai (The Wars of the Lord)". His dissertation advisers were Shlomo Pines of the Hebrew University of Jerusalem and Milton Fisk of Indiana University.

Academic positions
He was Hillel director at Indiana University from 1962-1967 and at Princeton University from 1968-1973.

From 1963–1967 he was a teaching assistant in the philosophy department at Indiana University. He was a visiting lecturer in the philosophy department at Brooklyn College from 1969–1970 and a visiting associate professor in the Hebraic Studies department at Rutgers University from 1969–1973.

From 1973-1975, Samuelson was on the faculty of the University of Virginia. Beginning in 1975, he was an associate professor in the Religion Department at Temple University; in 1987 he became a full professor, and continued in this position until 1998. At that point he moved to Arizona State University, where he became the Harold and Jean Grossman Professor of Jewish Studies in the Religious Studies Department. Since retirement from ASU, he has resided in Chicago.

Samuelson lectured at Vanderbilt University Divinity School and Lancaster University in England, and served as an assistant professor at the University of Virginia Department of Religious Studies (1973–1975), a visiting associate professor at the University of Pennsylvania Religious Studies Department (1984), and a guest professor at the University of Hamburg, Fachbereich evangelische Theologie (1993 and Summer 1995).

Fellowships and memberships
His fellowships included a Fulbright-Hayes Research Fellowship at Hebrew University of Jerusalem in 1967–1968; a fellowship at the Oxford Centre for Postgraduate Hebrew Studies at Oxford University in 1987; a fellowship at the Chicago Center for Religion and Science in 1992; and a Fulbright Senior Professor Travel Fellowship at the University of Hamburg, Germany, in 1993.

Samuelson was a founding member of the International Society for Science and Religion. He was a member of the board of directors of the Metanexus Institute and of that organization's academic board. He was also a member of the presidium of the International Franz Rosenzweig Gesellschaft, a member of the International Hermann Cohen Gesellschaft, and a member of the Editorial Board of The Journal of Jewish Thought and Philosophy.

He was a fellow of the Academy of Jewish Philosophy since 1979, serving as Chairman from 1979–1988 and Secretary-Treasurer from 1988 to the present.  He was a Life Member of Clare Hall, University of Cambridge, U.K.

Community service
For several years, Samuelson taught a weekly course on Maimonides' Mishneh Torah to rabbis in the East Valley of the Phoenix metropolitan area. From 2001–2004 he also delivered a weekly adult education class on the history of Jewish philosophy for the Reform and Conservative synagogues in the East Valley.  He also taught adult education classes at Anshe Emet Synagogue in Chicago.

Personal
Samuelson was married to Eileen Levinson from 1957 to 1996.  They had two children: Jeffrey (1962-2004) and Miriam (b. 1969).  Samuelson married Hava Tirosh-Rothschild in 1997, whereupon she changed her name to Hava Tirosh-Samuelson. Tirosh-Samuelson (born 1950, Kibbutz Afikim, Israel), is Director of Jewish Studies, Regents Professor of History, and Irving and Miriam Lowe Professor of Modern Judaism at Arizona State University. The Samuelsons co-founded the Judaism, Science and Medicine Group in ASU's Jewish Studies Department in 2008 and occasionally appear on the same conference programs. In 2006 the couple summarized their joint positions on transhumanism in an article in Milestones, published by the John Templeton Foundation. They divorced, and Samuelson married Jewish historian Amy Hill Shevitz in 2013.

Bibliography

Books
 (editor and translator)

Review by M. Goldberg, The Journal of Religion, April 1990, vol. 70, no. 2, pp. 282–283.

Review by Leonard S Kravitz, AJS Review, 1995, vol. 20, no. 1, pp. 202–205.

Review by Benjamin E. Sax, The Journal of Religion, April 2004, vol. 84, no. 2, pp. 324–326.
Review by Michael Zank, Modern Judaism, February 2004, vol. 24, no. 1, pp. 93–100.

Review by C. Oscar Jacob, Janus Head, 2005, 8(1), 388-393.
 (editor with Luc Anckaert and Martin Brasser)

Monographs

Book chapters
"Judaism and Science", chapter in

Peer-reviewed articles (selected)
Ethics of Globalization and the AIDS Crisis from a Jewish Perspective  Zygon, 38, no. 1 (2003): 125-139
Autonomy in Jewish Philosophy "Journal of the American Academy of Religion," 72, no. 2 (2004): 560-563
The Death and Revival of Jewish Philosophy Journal of the American Academy of Religion, Mar., 2002, vol. 70, no. 1, p. 117-134
Rethinking Ethics in the Light of Jewish Thought and the Life Sciences   Journal of Religious Ethics, 29, no. 2 (2001): 209-233
Culture And History: Essential Partners In The Conversation Between Religion And Science ;Zygon, 40, no. 2 (2005): 335-350
Creation and the Symbiosis of Science and Judaism  Zygon, 37, no. 1 (2002): 137-142  
The Economy of the Gift: Paul Ricoeur's Significance for Theological Ethics  Journal of Religious Ethics, 29, no. 2 (2001): 235-260
On the Symbiosis of Science and Religion: A Jewish Perspective  Zygon, 35, no. 1 (2000): 83-97
That the God of the Philosophers Is Not the God of Abraham, Isaac, and Jacob  The Harvard Theological Review, Jan., 1972, vol. 65, no. 1, p. 1-27
Ibn Daud's Conception of Prophecy Journal of the American Academy of Religion, Sep., 1977, vol. 45, no. 3, p. 354
"Maimonides' Doctrine of Creation", The Harvard Theological Review, Vol. 84, No. 3, July, 1991, pp. 249–271

References

1936 births
Living people
21st-century American philosophers
Arizona State University faculty
Northwestern University alumni
Hebrew Union College – Jewish Institute of Religion alumni
Indiana University alumni
People from Tempe, Arizona
20th-century American philosophers
Philosophers of Judaism
Brooklyn College faculty
Fulbright alumni